USS Argonaut (V-4/SF-7/SM-1/A-1/APS-1/SS-166) was a submarine of the United States Navy, the first boat to carry the name. Argonaut was laid down as V-4 on 1 May 1925 at Portsmouth Navy Yard. She was launched on 10 November 1927, sponsored by Mrs. Philip Mason Sears, the daughter of Rear Admiral William D. MacDougall, and commissioned on 2 April 1928. Although never officially designated as "SS-166", at some point she displayed this number on her conning tower.

Design
V-4 was the first of the second generation of V-boats commissioned in the late 1920s, which remain the largest non-nuclear submarines ever built by the United States. V-4 was the behemoth of its class. These submarines were exempt by special agreement from the armament and tonnage limitations of the Washington Treaty. Her configuration, and that of the following V-5 and V-6, resulted from an evolving strategic concept that increasingly emphasized the possibility of a naval war with Japan in the far western Pacific. This factor, and the implications of the 1922 Washington Naval Treaty, suggested the need for long-range submarine "cruisers", or "strategic scouts", as well as long-range minelayers, for which long endurance, not high speed, was most important. The design was possibly influenced by the German "U-cruisers" of the Type U-139 and Type U-151 U-boat classes, although V-4, V-5, and V-6 were all larger than these. V-4 and her near-sisters V-5 and V-6 were initially designed with larger and more powerful MAN-designed diesel engines than the Busch-Sulzer engines that propelled earlier V-boats, which were failures. The specially built engines failed to produce their design power, and some developed dangerous crankcase explosions. The smaller diesels were required to allow sufficient space for mine storage.

The engine specifications as built were two BuEng-manufactured, MAN-designed direct-drive 6-cylinder 4-cycle main diesel engines,  each.

A more successful propulsion improvement in V-4 was the replacement of earlier submarines' pairs of 60-cell batteries with a pair of 120-cell batteries, thus doubling the available voltage to the electric motors when submerged. This battery configuration would be standard until the GUPPY program following World War II. V-4 and her sisters were slow in diving and, when submerged, were unwieldy and slower than designed. They also presented an excellent target for surface ship sonar and had a large turning radius.

For the first time in U.S. submarine construction, the Portsmouth Navy Yard utilized welding during the assembly process. Led by Navy welding expert James W. Owens, welding was used in non-critical areas such as the superstructure, piping brackets, and support framing. V-4 ended up being built to a mixed method construction, with both the inner and outer hulls still riveted. Owens was eager to expand the use of welding in ship construction, and its use on V-4 was entirely successful. All subsequent submarines built for the USN used welding to some extent, with the method adopted in whole in 1936.

Designed primarily as a minelayer, and built at a cost of US$6,150,000, V-4 was the first and only such specialized type ever built by the United States. She had four torpedo tubes forward and two minelaying tubes aft. At the time of construction, V-4 was the largest submarine ever built in the U.S., and was the largest in U.S. Navy service for 30 years.

Her minelaying arrangements were "highly ingenious, but extremely complicated", filling two aft compartments. A compensating tube ran down the center of the two spaces, to make up for the lost weight as mines were laid, as well as to store eight additional mines. The other mines were racked in three groups around this tube, two in the fore compartment, one aft, with a hydraulically driven rotating cage between them. Mines were moved by hydraulic worm shafts, the aft racks connecting directly to the launch tubes, which had vertically sliding hydraulic doors (rather than the usual hinged ones of torpedo tubes). Each launch tube was normally loaded with four mines, and a water 'round mines (WRM) tube flooded to compensate as they were laid, then pumped into the compensating tube. Eight mines could be laid in 10 minutes.

Interwar period
Following commissioning, V-4 served with Submarine Division 12 based at Newport, Rhode Island.

She proved perennially underpowered, but engine replacement was postponed by war, and her MAN diesels were a constant source of trouble.

In January–February 1929, V-4 underwent a series of trials off Provincetown, Massachusetts. This mark was the greatest depth an American submarine had reached up to that time. On 26 February 1929, V-4 was assigned to Submarine Division 20 (SubDiv 20), and arrived at San Diego, California on 23 March. From there, she participated in battle exercises and made cruises along the West Coast.

In 1931, the V-4 was heavily featured in Seas Beneath, an American action film directed by John Ford. The V-4 was repainted to appear as a World War I German submarine, the fictional 'U-172'.

V-4 was renamed Argonaut on 19 February 1931, and redesignated SM-1 (submarine, minelayer) on 1 July. On 30 June 1932, she arrived at Pearl Harbor, where she was assigned to SubDiv 7. She carried out minelaying operations, patrol duty, and other routine work. In October 1934 and again in May 1939, Argonaut took part in joint Army-Navy exercises in the Hawaiian operating area. Argonaut became the flagship of Submarine Squadron 4 (SubRon 4). The submarine returned to the West Coast in April 1941 to participate in fleet tactical exercises.

World War II

She was notified by radio of the Japanese attack on Pearl Harbor when she surfaced a few minutes after sunset on 7 December. Argonaut set general quarters two hours later to investigate naval gunfire around Midway. While designed as a minelayer and not an attack submarine, Argonaut made the first wartime approach on enemy naval forces; but poor maneuverability prevented reaching a suitable position for surfaced torpedo launch against the two Japanese destroyers shelling Midway. One of the destroyers saw Argonaut as she dived to make a submerged second approach in the bright moonlight; but the destroyer was unable to locate the submerged submarine, and Argonaut was again unable to maneuver into position to launch torpedoes. After being held down all night, Argonaut surfaced at dawn to recharge batteries and was unsuccessfully bombed by a United States plane from Midway.

Argonauts dehumidifiers were ineffective at preventing condensation, which caused electrical fires making various pieces of electrical machinery inoperative. Three crewmen were sick with high fevers, but President Roosevelt's mention of Argonauts contribution to the war effort in a radio speech encouraged Barchet to resist the temptation to abort the patrol. By trimming the submarine 17 tons heavy, the crew was able to reduce diving time to 52 seconds by skillfully coordinated pumping between fore and aft ballast tanks; but that time was still considered too slow to avoid hostile aircraft.

Conversion to troop transport
On 22 January 1942, she returned to Pearl Harbor and, after a brief stop, proceeded to Mare Island Naval Shipyard for major overhaul. While there, her diesels were replaced with General Motors Winton 12-258Ss totaling  with hydraulic drive through reduction gears, and her minelaying gear was removed to prepare for conversion to a troop transport submarine. The auxiliary diesel generator was replaced by a  GM Winton 8-268A and a  GM Winton 4-268A. She was also fitted with a Torpedo Data Computer (lack of which likely inhibited her ability to score with torpedoes), new electronics, and two external stern torpedo tubes on the after casing, along with two stern deck stowage tubes. It appears she was not fitted with bow external torpedo tubes, as were Narwhal and Nautilus, as photos taken after the refit do not show them. On return to Pearl Harbor, the conversion to a troop transport submarine was "hastily" finished.

Argonaut returned to action in the South Pacific in August. Admiral Chester W. Nimitz assigned Argonaut and Nautilus to transport and land Marine Raiders on Makin Island in the Gilbert Islands for the Makin Raid. This move was designed to relieve pressure on American forces that had just landed on Guadalcanal. On 8 August, the two submarines embarked 120 troops of Companies A and B, 2nd Raider Battalion, and got underway for Makin. Conditions during the transit were unpleasant, and most of the marines became seasick. The convoy arrived off Makin on 16 August, and at 03:30 the next day the Marines began landing. Their rubber rafts were swamped by the sea and most of the outboard motors drowned. The Japanese—either forewarned or extraordinarily alert—were ready for the Americans' arrival. Snipers were hidden in the trees, and the landing beaches were in front of the Japanese forces instead of behind them as planned. However, by midnight of 18 August, the Japanese garrison of about 85 men was wiped out; radio stations, fuel, and other supplies and installations were destroyed, and all but 30 of the troops had been recovered.

Sinking
Argonaut arrived back in Pearl Harbor on 26 August. Her hull classification symbol was changed from SM-1 to APS-1 (transport submarine) on 22 September. She was never formally designated SS-166, but that hull number was reserved for her and a photo shows she occasionally displayed it. Her base of operations was transferred to Brisbane, Queensland, later in the year. In December, she departed Brisbane under Lieutenant Commander John R. Pierce to patrol the hazardous area between New Britain and Bougainville Island, south of Bismarck Archipelago. On 2 January 1943, Argonaut sank the Japanese gunboat Ebon Maru in the Bismarck Sea. On 10 January, Argonaut spotted a convoy of five freighters and their escorting destroyers—, and —returning to Rabaul from Lae. By chance, an army aircraft—which was out of bombs—was flying overhead and witnessed Argonaut attack. A crewman on board the plane saw one destroyer hit by a torpedo, and the destroyers promptly counterattacking. Argonaut bow suddenly broke the water at an unusual angle. It was apparent that a depth charge had severely damaged the submarine. The destroyers continued circling Argonaut, pumping shells into her; she slipped below the waves and was never heard from again. One hundred and two officers and men went down with her, the worst loss of life for an American submarine in wartime. Her name was stricken from the Naval Vessel Register on 26 February.

Japanese reports made available at the end of the war recorded a depth charge attack followed by gunfire, at which time they "destroyed the top of the sub".

On the basis of the report given by the Army flier who witnessed the attack in which Argonaut sank, she was credited with damaging a Japanese destroyer on her last patrol. (Postwar, the JANAC accounting gave her none.) Since none of the histories of the three escorting destroyers reports damage on 10 January 1943, the destroyer "hit" may have been a premature explosion.

Before her crew left for their third war patrol, they donated Argonaut bell. Nearly 20 months after her loss, the Submarine Memorial Chapel was built and dedicated on the Submarine Base in Pearl Harbor.  The bell hanging in her steeple comes from Argonaut, and still rings today for services.

Awards

See also
- British minelaying submarine of same period.

References

 Schlesman, Bruce and Roberts, Stephen S., "Register of Ships of the U.S. Navy, 1775–1990: Major Combatants" (Greenwood Press, 1991), 
 Lenton, H. T. American Submarines (Navies of the Second World War) (Doubleday, 1973), 
 Silverstone, Paul H., U.S. Warships of World War II (Ian Allan, 1965), 
 Campbell, John Naval Weapons of World War Two (Naval Institute Press, 1985), 
 Whitman, Edward C.  "The Navy's Variegated V-Class: Out of One, Many?" Undersea Warfare, Fall 2003, Issue 20
 https://web.archive.org/web/20140322093118/http://www.fleetsubmarine.com/sublist.html
 Gardiner, Robert and Chesneau, Roger, Conway's All the World's Fighting Ships 1922–1946, Conway Maritime Press, 1980. .
 Friedman, Norman "US Submarines through 1945: An Illustrated Design History", Naval Institute Press, Annapolis:1995, .
 Johnston, David "No More Heads or Tails: The Adoption of Welding in U.S. Navy Submarines", The Submarine Review, June 2020, pp. 46–64
 Navsource.org USS Argonaut (SM-1) photo page
 Pigboats.com V-4 page
 DiGiulian, Tony Navweaps.com 6"/53 caliber gun

External links

On Eternal Patrol: USS Argonaut

V-boats
Ships built in Kittery, Maine
1927 ships
World War II submarines of the United States
Lost submarines of the United States
Shipwrecks in the Bismarck Sea
World War II shipwrecks in the Pacific Ocean
Ships lost with all hands
Maritime incidents in January 1943
Submarines sunk by Japanese warships